The 2023 McDonald's All-American Girls Game is an all-star basketball game that will be played on March 28, 2023, at Toyota Center in Houston, Texas. The game's rosters featured the best and most highly recruited high school girls graduating in the class of 2023. The game will be the 21st annual version of the McDonald's All-American Game first played in 2002. The 24 players were selected from over 700 nominees by a committee of basketball experts. They were chosen not only for their on-court skills, but for their performances off the court as well.

Rosters
The roster was announced on January 24, 2023. Arizona, Notre Dame, LSU, South Carolina and UConn had the most selections with two selections each.

Team East

Team West

References

External links
McDonald's All-American

2023 in American women's basketball
McDonald's All-American Girls Game